Calcium-alpha-ketoglutarate (C5H4CaO5•H2O) is a special form mineral calcium that can be used to restore calcium concentration level in the blood back to normal. Calcium-alpha-ketoglutarate binds excess phosphate and pass it as a waste, re-establishing normal balance of calcium and phosphate in the body.

Health benefits

While phosphate and calcium concentration levels are normally kept in balance in healthy bodies, patients with Hyperparathyroidism have been shown to benefit from Calcium-alpha-ketoglutarate by reducing elevated concentration level of phosphate in the blood.

Importance to bodybuilders 

Calcium-alpha-ketoglutarate can be useful as a supplement for Bodybuilders who frequently have low calcium concentration level due to their high intake of proteins such as Micellar casein and Whey protein.

See also
 Hyperparathyroidism

References 

Bodybuilding supplements
Calcium compounds